Donghai (East Sea) may refer to:

China
East China Sea, also known as Donghai from its Chinese name (东海), a marginal sea east of China
East Sea (Chinese literature), one of the Four Seas, a literary name for the boundaries of China
Donghai County (东海县), of Lianyungang, Jiangsu
Donghai Island (东海岛), island in Zhanjiang, Guangdong
Donghai Subdistrict
Donghai Subdistrict, Quanzhou, in Fengze District, Quanzhou, Fujian
Donghai Subdistrict, Lufeng, Shanwei, Guangdong
Donghai Subdistrict, Jixi, in Chengzihe District, Jixi, Heilongjiang
Donghai Subdistrict, Tianjin, in Hexi District, Tianjin
Towns named Donghai (东海镇)
Donghai, Putian County, Fujian
Donghai, Jidong County, Heilongjiang
Donghai, Qidong, Jiangsu
Donghai Commandery, historical commandery in present-day Shandong and Jiangsu

Vietnam
Đông Hải District, in Bac Lieu Province, Vietnam

See also
East Sea (disambiguation)
Nanhai (disambiguation) ("South Sea")
Beihai (disambiguation) ("North Sea")
Xihai (disambiguation) ("West Sea")
 東海 (disambiguation), the East Asian script for "East Sea"
 Donghae (disambiguation), Korean romanization
 Tōkai (disambiguation), Japanese romanization 
 Tunghai (disambiguation), Wade–Giles romanization